Vladimir Mikhaylovich Smirnov may refer to:

 Vladimir Smirnov (politician) (1887–1937), Russian Communist and Bolshevik
 Vladimir Smirnov (skier) (born 1964), Soviet/Kazachstani cross-country skier, multiple Winter Olympics medalist

See also 
 Vladimir Smirnov (disambiguation)